Central Ontario Secondary Schools Association is a high school athletic association in Ontario, Canada. It is a member of the Ontario Federation of School Athletic Associations.

Sports offered

Member schools and classifications

Kawartha

Bay of Quinte

Source

References

External links
 Website

Sports governing bodies in Ontario